Some board games, such as chess and Go, use an adjournment mechanism to suspend the game in progress so it can be continued at another time, typically the following day. The rationale is that games often extend in duration beyond what is reasonable for a single session of play. There may be a : the next move that would be made is sealed in an envelope, to be played out when the game resumes (normally played by the director or arbiter). This practice ensures that neither player knows what the board position will be when it is their next turn to move.

Chess

When an adjournment is made, the player whose move it is secretly writes their next move on their scoresheet but does not make the move on the chessboard.  Both opponents' scoresheets are then placed in the sealed-move envelope and the envelope is sealed. The names of the players, the colors, the position, the time on the clocks and other game data are recorded on the envelope; the envelope may also be signed by both players.  The arbiter then keeps possession of the envelope until it is time to restart the game, at which time the arbiter opens the envelope, makes the sealed move on the board, and starts the opponent's clock. 

Under USCF rules, if the sealed move is ambiguous and subject to more than one interpretation, the opponent of the player making the sealed move may choose among the reasonable interpretations .  If the sealed move is illegal and there is no reasonable interpretation, the player making the sealed move loses the game .  Under FIDE rules, sealing an ambiguous move will also lose the game.

Schedules allowing for adjournment usually fall into either of two categories:
 2 hours per player for the first forty moves, followed by adjournment (a five-hour session)
 Two hours per player for the first forty moves, followed by one hour for the next twenty moves, followed by adjournment (a six-hour session)

The rules for adjourning a game of chess are as follows:
Once the time control has passed, either player has the option of adjourning, and may do so on their move.
If a player exercises that option, they forfeit the remainder of their time that had been allotted for that session.
When the duration of the session has ended, it is imperative for the player with the move to adjourn the game.
A player adjourns the game by recording their move secretly in an envelope and sealing it. Upon resumption, the arbiter makes the sealed move and the game continues.

The first three rules are designed to encourage players to continue games until the end of the session, but no longer. The last rule ensures that upon adjournment neither player knows what the position will be when it is their next turn to move, maintaining fairness of potential interim analysis of the adjourned positions. However, it can be advantageous to be the player who makes the sealed move, especially if the move forces a specific response from the other player.

Considerations on when to adjourn a game can be complex, and involve an extra dimension of psychology that is not part of strictly logical gameplay.

With the advent of strong chess playing computer programs, which can be used to analyze adjourned positions, most tournaments have abandoned adjourning games in favor of shorter time controls. The first World Chess Championship not to use adjournments was the Classical World Chess Championship 1995, while the last one to use adjournments was the FIDE World Chess Championship 1996.

Go
Adjournments are common in long matches of the game of Go. Major Japanese title matches like the Honinbo, Kisei and Meijin commonly have thinking time of over eight hours per player. Such matches are played over two days and use a sealed move during the adjournment. As in chess, a sealed move may have a forced response, giving an advantage to the sealing player. Sealing a move that has no purpose other than to force a particular answer from one's opponent is considered poor etiquette.

Other games
Other games that use adjournments and sealed moves are typically also strategic two player board games, such as xiangqi or shogi.

Notes

References

Rules of chess
Chess terminology
Rules of Go